The Rangiora River is a river of the Wellington Region of the North Island of  New Zealand.

See also
List of rivers of New Zealand

References

Rivers of the Wellington Region
Rivers of New Zealand